Coen Kranenberg (born 28 September 1947) is a Dutch field hockey player. His team placed fourth at the 1972 Summer Olympics and the 1976 Summer Olympics.

References

External links
 

1947 births
Living people
Dutch male field hockey players
Olympic field hockey players of the Netherlands
Field hockey players at the 1972 Summer Olympics
Field hockey players at the 1976 Summer Olympics
Field hockey players from Amsterdam
20th-century Dutch people